Johnny White's is a bar in New Orleans known for remaining open despite Hurricane Katrina.

References

External links
 

Culture of New Orleans
Drinking establishments in New Orleans